Boravancha is a village in Eluru district of the Indian state of Andhra Pradesh. It is located in Nuzvid mandal under Nuzvid revenue division.

References

Villages in Eluru district